Ides or IDES may refer to:

Calendar dates
 Ides (calendar), a day in the Roman calendar that fell roughly in the middle of the month. In March, May, July, and October it was the 15th day of the month; in other months it was the 13th.
Ides of March, a day in the Roman calendar that corresponded to March 15; it was marked by several religious observances and became notorious as the date of the assassination of Julius Caesar in 44 BC.

People
 Saint Ides, an Irish saint

Music
 "St. Ides Heaven", a song by Elliott Smith, released on his album Elliott Smith (album)
 "St. Ides of March", a song by Soledad Brothers (band)
 "The Ides of March", a song by Iron Maiden (band)
 The Ides of March (band), an American rock band that had a major hit with the song "Vehicle" in 1970

Technology
 Intrusion Detection Expert System or IDES
 SAP AG's IDES, Internet Demonstration and Evaluation System

Other uses
 St. Ides, a brand of malt liquor
 Initiative for the Development of Soria or IDES, a regional political party in Spain
 Illinois Department of Employment Security

See also
IDE (disambiguation)
 Idis (Germanic), a being in Germanic paganism